Heman Laurence Dowd (November 28, 1887 – June 4, 1968) was an American college football player and coach. He served as the head football coach at Stevens Institute of Technology in 1910 and Washington and Lee University in 1913, compiling a career college football coaching record of 10–6–1.

Dowd was born on November 28, 1887, in Orange, New Jersey. He graduated from the Columbia University College of Physicians and Surgeons in 1913 and subsequently worked as a medical intern as St. Luke's Hospital and St. Mary's Free Hospital for Children.  He married Alice Richard on May 24, 1917 at Saint Thomas Church in Manhattan.

Dowd died of a heart attack on June 4, 1968, in New York City.

Head coaching record

References

External links
 Sports-Reference profile

1887 births
1968 deaths
Princeton Tigers football coaches
Princeton Tigers football players
Stevens Tech Ducks football coaches
Washington and Lee Generals football coaches
Columbia University Vagelos College of Physicians and Surgeons alumni
People from Orange, New Jersey
Physicians from New York City